Just a Little Inconvenience is a 1977 American made-for-television post-war drama film written and directed  by Theodore J. Flicker and starring Lee Majors, James Stacy and Barbara Hershey.

For his performance as a double-amputee Vietnam veteran, Stacy got a  Primetime Emmy Award nomination for Outstanding Lead Actor in a Drama or Comedy Special. The film also earned a nomination for a Golden Globe for Best Motion Picture Made for TV.

Plot 
Frank Logan (Lee Majors), a Vietnam War veteran, attempts to rehabilitate his friend, Kenny Briggs (James Stacy), who had lost an arm and a leg during the war. Logan teaches Briggs how to ski, and Briggs begins to see his double amputations as "just a little inconvenience."

Cast 

 Lee Majors as Frank Logan
 James Stacy as Kenny Briggs 
 Barbara Hershey as Nikki Klausing 
 Jim Davis as Dave Erickson
 Charles Cioffi as Maj. Bloom
 Lane Bradbury as B-Girl
 John Furey as Bartender
 Bob Hastings as Harry  
 Frank Parker as Bill

References

External links 

1977 television films
1977 films
1970s war drama films
American war drama films
Films directed by Theodore J. Flicker
Vietnam War films
NBC network original films
American drama television films
1970s American films